Caullaraju or Jeulla Rajo (possibly from Quechua qiwlla gull, rahu snow, ice, mountain with snow, "snow-covered gull mountain") is a mountain in the Cordillera Blanca in the Andes of Peru, about 5,682 m (18,642 ft) high. It is located in the Ancash Region, Recuay Province. In the IGN-Peru map, the highest peak is reported to be named Jenhuaracra.

See also 
Lake Conococha

References

Mountains of Peru
Mountains of Ancash Region